3-Methylmethcathinone, also known as 3-MMC and metaphedrone, is a designer drug from the substituted cathinone family. 3-MMC is closely related in structure to the more commonly known illicit drug mephedrone (4-MMC), and is also illegal in most countries that have banned mephedrone due to 3-MMC being a structural isomer of 4-MMC. However, 3-MMC has still appeared on the recreational drug market as an alternative to mephedrone, and was first identified being sold in Sweden in 2012.
Unlike other legal highs 3-MMC was tested and characterized in large mammals, providing much more knowledge about it than is known about other synthetic cathinones. 3-MMC is a monoamine transporter substrate that potently inhibits norepinephrine uptake and displays more pronounced dopaminergic vs. serotonergic activity.

History

3-MMC was first encountered in Sweden in 2012, it was created as a designer drug following the control in many countries of the related compound mephedrone. It was sold as a research chemical, usually in powder form. There is no known or reported medical use of 3-MMC and it is being used for recreation. Some fatal intoxications have been reported although only a few involved 3-MMC only.

Structure 
3-Methylmethcathinone (3-MMC) chemical name is 2-(methylamino)-1-(3-methylphenyl)propan-1-one) and is a cathinone derivative, which is a synthetic form of phenylethylamines. 3-MMC has a cathinone which is substituted with a methyl group at the 3 position which makes it a structural isomer of Mephedrone.

3-MMC contains a chiral center at the C-2 carbon. Therefore two enantiomers exist, the R and S enantiomer. It is assumed that the S form is more potent due to its similarity to cathinone. But further research has to be done to confirm this.

Synthesis 
There are several ways to synthesize 3-MMC. One of ways to synthesize 3-MMC, which is adapted from Power et al, is to add ethyl magnesium bromide to 3-methylbenzaldehyde (I). The product (II) is then oxidized by pyridinium chlorochromate (PCC) on silica gel to the keton (III) and brominated with hydrobromic acid to yield the bromo ketone (IV). This bromo ketone is reacted with ethanolic methylamine to produce the 3-MMC free base (V), which can be converted to the hydrochloride salt (VI) by addition of ethereal hydrogen chloride (VI).

Reactions 
There are no simple conversions into controlled substances.

Available forms 
The most common form of 3-MMC is as a white crystalline powder or as white solid crystals. Sometimes however it is also sold as capsules filled with 3-MMC. There is no information available whether it is a racemate or enantiomerically pure.

Mechanism of action 
The studies of pharmacology are currently lacking but it was found 3-MMC just like 4-MMC inhibits norepinephrine (NET), serotonin (SERT) and dopamine (DAT) transporters. 3-MMC inhibits NET and DAT more potently than SERT which suggests that 3-MMC has stronger amphetamine-like stimulant properties compared to mephedrone.

3-MMC strongly binds to serotonin 5-HT1A, 5-HT2A and 5-HT2C receptors. In addition, 3-MMC binds weakly to the α1A and α2A adrenergic receptors.

Metabolism 
The metabolism pathway of 3-MMC is not yet fully known. From analysis of human pubic hair of a drug dealer it is known that 3-methylephedrine and 3-methylnorephedrine are metabolites of the drug. A possible metabolic pathway is β-keto-reduction followed by N-demethylation.

Efficacy 
Generally, 3-MMC is taken via inhalation, injection, insufflation or oral administration. Repeated use of 3-MMC in a single session, often via different routes, has also been seen. The dosages range from threshold, light, common, strong and heavy corresponding to 50 mg, 50–150 mg, 150–250 mg, 250–350 mg and 350+mg respectively. Most self-reported doses range from 50 to 150 mg or even up to 500 mg. Furthermore, most users report repeated usage in order to extend their euphoric experience often leading to 0.5g to 2g of 3-MMC consumed in one sitting or even within a few hours. The drug lasts from 4–6 hours with its peak being 2–3 hours long. In a questionnaire-based study of self-reported 3-MMC users in Slovenia, it was found that 88.8% of users insufflated the drug while 42.6% took it orally. The study did not find any instances of users injecting 3-MMC. Moreover, 26% of the users reported taking more than 1.5 g of 3-MMC in a single sitting and over 50% reported having consuming more than 0.5g in a single sitting.

Effects 
The desired effects of 3-MMC are stimulation, spontaneous bodily sensations, euphoria, enhancement of empathy, affection and sociability, happiness, awareness and an increased appreciation of music which are similar effects of other amphetamines and drugs of abuse. The adverse effects can range from stuttering, fatigue, verbosity, reduced level of consciousness, depression, aggression, delirium and confusion, double vision, difficulty in concentration, headaches, dehydration, hallucinations, fear to more serious effects such as hyponatremia, diaphoresis, seizures, hyperthermia and rhabdomyolysis.

Toxicity 
Very few cases of overdoses have been recorded in literature for concentrations between 249 and 1600 ng/mL for 3-MMC. Since the concentration range is quite high in the literature, defining the concentration at which impairment or fatality occurs is very difficult. No correlation between the measured concentration and the type of intoxication was found. The most likely cause for this is the chemical instability of the drug.

Effects on animals 
In animals, 3-MMC has a rather high absorption rate with the peak concentration being achieved within 5 to 10 minutes after oral ingestion and a plasma half-life of 0.8 hours. The bioavailability was tested to be around 7% and 3-MMC levels dropped below detectable levels after 24 hours of oral ingestion. Moreover, 3-MMC caused a significant change in the feeding behaviour of animals often resulting in weight loss over time. Caution is needed when applying the data for human safety from the extrapolated animal data because of low sample size, lack of data and low dosage.

Legal status
In the United States 3-MMC is considered a schedule 1 controlled substance as a positional isomer of Mephedrone (4-MMC)

3-MMC is currently being developed as a medicine by a publicly traded company MindMed Inc NASDAQ:MNMD based on a patent titled "Use of 3-methylmethcathinone"

Since October 2015, 3-MMC is a controlled substance in China.

3-MMC is banned in the Czech Republic.

3-MMC was not banned by the United Nations Office on Drugs and Crime (UNODC) after a critical review.

Effective 28 October 2021, 3-MMC has been scheduled under the Dutch Opium Law and is therefore illegal in the Netherlands.

References 

Cathinones
Designer drugs
Entactogens and empathogens